Asim Hrnjić (born 15 February 1964) is a Bosnian retired footballer. He worked as an assistant manager at Čelik Zenica.

Club career
He started his career at hometown club Natron before joining NK Zenica in 1994. He later played for Velež Mostar and Rudar Kakanj before calling it a day at 40 years of age and playing for TOŠK Tešanj.

International career
Hrnjić made his debut in Bosnia and Herzegovina's first ever official international game, a November 1995 friendly match away against Albania, and has earned a total of 7 caps, scoring 3 goals. His final international was a March 1997 Dunhill Cup match against China.

International goals

References

External links

Profile - NFSBIH

1964 births
Living people
People from Maglaj
Association football forwards
Yugoslav footballers
Bosnia and Herzegovina footballers
Bosnia and Herzegovina international footballers
FK Velež Mostar players
FK Rudar Kakanj players
NK TOŠK Tešanj players